Tamatea is a suburb in the west of the city of Napier, in the Hawke's Bay Region of New Zealand's eastern North Island.

Demographics

Tamatea had a population of 5,415 at the 2018 New Zealand census, an increase of 375 people (7.4%) since the 2013 census, and an increase of 294 people (5.7%) since the 2006 census. There were 2,031 households, comprising 2,598 males and 2,814 females, giving a sex ratio of 0.92 males per female, with 1,224 people (22.6%) aged under 15 years, 1,032 (19.1%) aged 15 to 29, 2,190 (40.4%) aged 30 to 64, and 963 (17.8%) aged 65 or older.

Ethnicities were 78.1% European/Pākehā, 28.5% Māori, 4.0% Pacific peoples, 5.0% Asian, and 1.9% other ethnicities. People may identify with more than one ethnicity.

The percentage of people born overseas was 13.1, compared with 27.1% nationally.

Although some people chose not to answer the census's question about religious affiliation, 53.5% had no religion, 32.8% were Christian, 3.2% had Māori religious beliefs, 0.3% were Hindu, 0.3% were Muslim, 0.6% were Buddhist and 1.8% had other religions.

Of those at least 15 years old, 498 (11.9%) people had a bachelor's or higher degree, and 1,017 (24.3%) people had no formal qualifications. 378 people (9.0%) earned over $70,000 compared to 17.2% nationally. The employment status of those at least 15 was that 2,049 (48.9%) people were employed full-time, 588 (14.0%) were part-time, and 153 (3.7%) were unemployed.

Education

All these schools are co-educational. Rolls are as of

References

Suburbs of Napier, New Zealand